Skotfoss Bruk was a paper mill located in Skotfoss, Skien, Norway. The mill was part of the Union Co., founded in 1890. It closed production on 31 December 1986.

The first electric industrial railway in Norway opened in 1892 at Skotfoss Bruk.

References

Manufacturing companies established in 1890
Manufacturing companies disestablished in 1986
Buildings and structures in Skien
Pulp and paper mills in Norway
1890 establishments in Norway
1986 disestablishments in Norway